Cuauhtototzin  was a king of Cuauhnahuac.

Family
Cuauhtototzin was a son and successor of King Tezcacohuatzin. His sister was Empress Miahuaxihuitl.

He was a father of Empress Chichimecacihuatzin I and uncle of her husband Moctezuma I.

Cuauhtototzin was a grandfather of  Princess Atotoztli II, who was a mother of kings Axayacatl, Tizoc and Ahuitzotl.

Family tree

See also
List of people from Morelos

References

Sources
Tlahuica Peoples of Morelos
Visions of Paradise: Primordial Titles and Mesoamerican History in Cuernavaca by Robert Haskett

Tlatoque